The Roman Catholic Diocese of Diphu is a diocese located in the city of Diphu in the Ecclesiastical province of Guwahati in India.

History
 5 December 1983: Established as Diocese of Diphu from the Metropolitan Archdiocese of Shillong–Gauhati. The foundation stone was blessed by Pope John Paul 2 during his pastoral visit to Shillong.

Leadership

References

External links
 GCatholic.org 
 Catholic Hierarchy 
  Diocese website 

Roman Catholic dioceses in India
Christian organizations established in 1983
Roman Catholic dioceses and prelatures established in the 20th century
1983 establishments in Assam
Christianity in Assam
Karbi Anglong district